Oba Eletu Kekere, son of Oba Gabaro, reigned briefly as Oba of Lagos following Oba Akinsemoyin's death in 1775. Not much is known about Eletu Kekere's reign other than him being childless.

References

People from Lagos
Obas of Lagos
History of Lagos
Yoruba monarchs
18th-century monarchs in Africa
18th-century Nigerian people
18th-century in Lagos
Residents of Lagos